Manuel Martínez Canales (21 May 1928 – 25 July 2014), known as Manolín was a Spanish professional footballer who played as a midfielder.

Career 
Born in Getxo, Manolín played for first division sides Athletic Bilbao, Real Madrid and Real Zaragoza. He retired in 1960 after short spells with Segunda División sides Recreativo de Huelva and SD Indautxu.

Manolín earned one cap for the Spanish national side, playing against Argentina in Buenos Aires on 5 July 1953.

Death 
He died on 25 July 2014 at the age of 86.

Honours 
Athletic Club
Copa del Rey: 1949–50, 1955
Copa Eva Duarte: 1950

Real Madrid
European Cup: 1955-56

References

1928 births
2014 deaths
Spanish footballers
Arenas Club de Getxo footballers
Athletic Bilbao footballers
Real Madrid CF players
Real Zaragoza players
Recreativo de Huelva players
La Liga players
Segunda División players
Association football midfielders
Spanish football managers
Deportivo Alavés managers
Barakaldo CF managers
Spain international footballers